Robert Downey may refer to:
Robert Downey Sr. (1935–2021), American film director
Robert Downey Jr. (born 1965), American actor
Robert Downey (hurler) (born 1999), Irish hurler

See also
Robert Downie (disambiguation)